Dirk Müller (born 29 November 1946) is a Dutch sculptor.

Gallery

References

External links

 Website Rijksbureau voor Kunsthistorische Documentatie

1946 births
Living people
People from Heemstede
Dutch sculptors
Dutch male sculptors